Diestel is a surname of German origin. Notable people with this surname include:

Arnold Diestel (1857–1924), German politician, First Mayor of Hamburg
Erich Diestel (1892–1973), Wehrmacht general during World War II
Joseph Diestel (1943–2017), American mathematician
Ludwig Diestel (1825–1879), German Protestant theologian
Peter-Michael Diestel (born 1952), German lawyer and politician, last East German Minister of the Interior

German-language surnames